King Alfred's Way is a 350 km predominantly off-road cycling route that officially starts and finishes under the statue of King Alfred in Winchester. The route was created by the charity Cycling UK. The charity spent three years working on the route which connects four of England’s National Trails: North Downs Way, South Downs Way, The Ridgeway, and Thames Path. Creating the route involved working with councils and landowners to upgrade footpaths to bridleways.

References

Cycleways in England
Winchester
Year of establishment missing